San Giacomo Filippo (Alpine Lombard: San Giacum) is a comune (municipality) in the Province of Sondrio in the Italian region Lombardy, located about  north of Milan and about  northwest of Sondrio, on the border with Switzerland.

The municipality of San Giacomo Filippo contains the frazioni (subdivisions, mainly villages and hamlets) San Bernardo ai Monti, Olmo, Sommarovina, Sant'Antonio di Albareda, Dalò, Uggia, Gallivaggio, Lirone, Cimaganda, Vho.

San Giacomo Filippo borders the following municipalities: Campodolcino, Chiavenna, Menarola, Mese, Mesocco (Switzerland), Piuro, Soazza (Switzerland).

Demographic evolution

References

Cities and towns in Lombardy
Valle Spluga